Hanaa Edwar (born 1946) is an Iraqi women's rights activist. She is the founder and general secretary of Iraqi Al-Amal Association, and co-founder of the Iraqi Women's Network.

Biography 
Hanaa Edwar was born to a Christian family in the Southern city of Basra, Iraq. She earned a degree in law from Baghdad University in 1967.

During her 50 years as an advocate, she has led countless campaigns for gender equality, including efforts to advance women's role in drafting the country's new constitution in 2005. Alongside allies, she secured a minimum 25 percent women's quota in the parliament and in the local governments. She was also a member of the expert team tasked with drafting a law addressing domestic violence in Iraq.

In June 2011 she interrupted a government television conference to challenge Prime Minister Nuri Al-Maliki about the army having arrested four protestors. After she challenged the prime minister publicly, a "bullet was left in an envelope outside her office."

Career 
Ms. Edwar founded the Al-Amal Association in 1992. Al-Amal focuses on building peace, promoting human rights, and sustainable development in Iraq. She has created a number of other prominent organizations, including the Arab Women's Court, formed in Beirut in 1996 with the aim of combating violence against women; the Arab NGO Network for Development, which supports, enables and empowers Arab civil societies in their quest for democracy, human rights and sustainable development; Asuda for Combating Violence against Women, based in Sulaimaniya since 2001; and Beit Khanzad, an Erbil-based shelter for women and children in 2002.

Awards 
Ms. Edwar was awarded the Sean MacBride Peace Prize 2011 by the International Peace Bureau (IPB), for her contribution “to the advancement of democracy and human rights”, and her “firm stand against violence and war.” In December 2011, she was awarded by UN mission in Iraq the Appreciation certificate of Human Rights Defender in honor for her work in promoting human rights in Iraq. She won Arab Woman of the Year Award in 2013.

References

External links 
 Interview

1946 births
Living people
Iraqi women's rights activists
University of Baghdad alumni
Women human rights activists
Iraqi Christians
People from Basra